Des Moines International Airport  is a commercial service airport 5 miles (8 km) southwest of Des Moines, the capital of Iowa. 

The airport's 2,600 acre campus includes two runways, 46 buildings, 7 parking facilities, and the terminal. Six commercial airlines offer service from DSM (American, Allegiant, Delta, Frontier, Southwest and United). The airport is managed by the Des Moines Airport Authority.

The National Plan of Integrated Airport Systems for 2017–2021 called it a primary commercial service airport. In 2016 a record 2.48 million passengers used the airport, up 5 percent from 2015. In 2019, DSM served 2.92 million passengers, a record for the airport.

The airport hosts the 132nd Wing of the Iowa Air National Guard.

History 
In the 1920s the Des Moines area had several small airports for general aviation and airmail. In 1929, the Iowa General Assembly passed a law allowing cities to sell bonds and levy assessments to build municipal airports. Over 80 sites were considered for the Des Moines Airport until a decision was made to build on 160 acres (0.65 km²) of farmland south of the city. Construction of the airport began in 1932 and was completed in 1933. The airport's first passenger terminal was built shortly after the airport was completed. It was replaced by a new terminal in 1950 that has been expanded and renovated several times. The present concourses were built in 1970, along with the remodeling of the terminal. The airport itself has expanded several times from its original  site and now covers 2,625 acres (10.6 km²).

The airport was originally governed by the City of Des Moines' Parks Department. A separate Aviation Department was established by the city during the 1960s, and in 1982, a separate Aviation Policy Advisory Board was established. The airport was renamed the Des Moines International Airport in 1986 to acknowledge the presence of a United States Customs Service office at the airport.

In 2011, the City of Des Moines transferred control from the city to the Des Moines Airport Authority. The city retains ownership of the land but transfers title to all property and equipment to the public authority.  In turn, the authority agreed to a 99-year lease on the land.

In 2016, a record 2.48 million passengers used the airport, up 5 percent from 2015.
Federal Aviation Administration records say the airport had 919,990 passenger boardings (enplanements) in calendar year 2008, 853,596 in 2009 and 932,828 in 2011.

In July 2021, the airport announced plans to become a base for Allegiant Air.

Expansion 
Interior renovation work began in 2009 on the airport and concluded in 2010. The project, designed by Brooks Borg Skiles AE LLP, included new carpets, paint, gate counters, seating, a new ceiling, signage, and a fire sprinkler system. Also included in the upgrade was a common-use project allowing any airline to use any gate at the airport. A new restroom was also added to the C concourse to allow for future concourse expansion. The airport modernized baggage handling capabilities with expanded processing facilities as well.

In addition to work inside the passenger terminal, the airport was building a rental car facility and new parking facilities.

Terminal Replacement 
In April 2022, the Des Moines International Airport released their terminal study, calling for a new terminal building to be built, replacing the current one. Older plans capped the airport capacity to 17 gates, 5 more than their current terminal design. The new plan allows for a minimum of 18 gates with a further expansion option of up to 22 gates and 5 additional commercial aircraft parking spaces with the project being built in phases to mitigate costs. The plan also includes US Customs and Border Protection for the airport to allow processing of international passengers. 

In May, the airport asked the surrounding towns and counties to contribute more than $2 million to the airport expansion plans. Work on the new terminal project isn't set to begin until 2024 with an estimated price tag of $769 million.

Facilities 
The airport covers 2,625 acres (1,062 ha) at an elevation of 958 feet (292 m). It has two runways: 5/23 is 9,004 by 150 feet (2,744 x 46 m); 13/31 is 9,002 by 150 feet (2,744 x 46 m).

In the year ending December 31, 2021, the airport had 66,320 aircraft operations, average 182 per day: 44% airline, 9% air taxi, 44% general aviation and 4% military. 105 aircraft were then based at the airport: 63 single-engine, 16 multi-engine, 23 jet, and three helicopter.

The terminal has two concourses; concourse A with gates A1–A5 (used by Allegiant Air, Southwest Airlines, United Airlines, and United Express) and concourse C, with gates C1–C7 (used by American Airlines, American Eagle, Delta Air Lines, Delta Connection, and Frontier Airlines).

The airport is home to a maintenance base for Endeavor Air.

Airlines and destinations

Passenger

Cargo

Air National Guard 

The Iowa Air National Guard has occupied an area located at the end of the runway since the 1960s and has been  home to the 132nd Wing.

With the increased need of RPA, Intelligence, surveillance and reconnaissance and cyber warfare in the 21st century the U.S. Air Force transitioned the 132nd from a F-16 Falcon fighter unit to an ISR and cyber warfare unit starting in 2013. This ended the 132nd's nearly 70-year history as a fighter wing having previously flown P-51 Mustangs then the F-84 Thunderstreak, F-100 Super Sabre, A-7 Corsair II and finally transitioning to the F-16 Falcon in the 1980s. Initially it had been considered to transition the wing to the A-10 Thunderbolt II in 2014 but it was felt by Iowa legislators that the ISR mission would offer more training and skills to the Airmen of the 132nd which would be applicable in the 21st century and help boost the Iowa economy. The 132nd participated in air combat during World War II, Desert Storm, and the Iraq War.

These mission changes created some debate over the base's status as an aeronautical base, as the Des Moines Airport attempted to void the base's lease and charge 'fair market value', consistent with FAA funding rules at the time.  In addition, the removal of the fighters had resulted in the disbanding of the guard's firefighting unit, forcing the airport to privatize firefighting operations which the base had previously provided.  The dispute was addressed in the short term by the reassignment of Black Hawk helicopters from Company C, 2nd Battalion, 147th Aviation Regiment, Iowa Army National Guard, from Boone, IA to the base, occupying the hangars that formerly held F-16s. This issue was permanently resolved by President Obama's signature on H.R. 5944, which allowed airports continued access to FAA grant funding by classifying RPA operations as aeronautical.

With the addition of the Army National Guard unit to the base, a transition to a joint base status has begun. Eventually, Air Force operations will occupy the area to the west of the main gate, while Army operations will occupy the east.

Statistics

Annual traffic

Top destinations

Accidents and incidents 
On December 2, 1978, Douglas C-47A N41447 of SMB Stage Line crashed short of the runway while on a cargo flight from Chicago, Illinois. Airframe icing was a factor in the accident.

On November 25, 1985, a Rockwell Aero Commander crashed on approach due to icing and possibly wake turbulence, killing the pilot and six members of the Iowa State University women's track team.

On December 1, 2007, a United Express plane carrying 44 passengers slid off a taxiway while taxiing to the runway for takeoff. No one was injured, but the airport was closed for seven hours after the incident because of the winter storm moving through the area.

On March 13, 2008, Delta Connection Flight 4704, an Atlanta-bound Bombardier CRJ-200 operated by Atlantic Southeast Airlines, was delayed more than five hours when a mouse was discovered shortly before take-off from DSM. Officials delayed the flight to inspect the plane for any damage that the mouse may have caused. Maintenance crews checked wiring and components on the aircraft. The flight took off at 11:39am.

On December 18, 2010, a small red Beechcraft Bonanza crashed while performing an emergency landing at DSM. The Airport Director stated that the small craft had engine problems and turned around for the airport. The aircraft eventually lost the engine and pilot was able to glide to the end of the runway. The aircraft clipped the end of the runway fence with its landing gear, making the nose of the craft dip into the snow. Police and emergency reported only minor injuries.

See also
 List of airports in Iowa
 Des Moines Area Regional Transit

References

Sources

External links 

 Des Moines International Airport, official site
 Aerial image as of 5 April 2000 from USGS The National Map
 
 

Airports in Iowa
Buildings and structures in Des Moines, Iowa
Transportation in Des Moines, Iowa
Transportation buildings and structures in Polk County, Iowa